Manuel Vilar i Roca (15 November 1812, Barcelona - 25 November 1860, Mexico City) was a Spanish sculptor, in the Romantic style.

Biography 
His first studies were at the Escola de la Llotja, with Damià Campeny. He also received advice from Bertel Thorvaldsen and was influenced by the Nazarene movement.

Upon his return to Spain, he became an instructor at the Escola. He served in that position until 1845, when he and the painter Pelegrí Clavé received offers of employment in Mexico. There, he became the head of the sculpture classes at the Academia de San Carlos.

During his tenure, he insisted on the rigorous study of anatomical models, the sketching of classical examples, practicing on blocks of marble, making plaster castings, and modelling with clay. He worked with religious and historical subjects, as well as the classics, which included themes from the Pre-Hispanic history of Mexico. Although his style owed much to Romanticism, he also introduced elements of Realism; giving his work an eclectic character.

His early works, in Barcelona, focused on Biblical and mythological subjects; including Jason stealing the golden fleece and the trial of Daniel in Babylon. His specifically Mexican subjects include Moctezuma, La Malinche, Iturbide and Tlahuicole, as well as numerous busts; notably Lucas Alamán and Antonio López de Santa Anna. He also created a statue of San Carlos Borromeo, which may be seen on the patio of the Academia.

Gallery

References

Further reading
 Salvador Moreno, El escultor Manuel Vilar, Instituto de Investigaciones Estéticas, Universidad Nacional Autónoma de México, 1969
 José Rogelio Álvarez, "Vilar, Manuel", in: Enciclopedia de México, 2005 
 "Vilar, Manuel", in: Diccionario Porrúa de historia, biografía y geografía de México, Vol.2, Editorial Porrúa, 1970

External links 

 Works by Vilar @ the Reial Acadèmia Catalana de Belles Arts de Sant Jordi

1812 births
1860 deaths
Sculptors from Catalonia
Mexican sculptors
Male sculptors
Spanish emigrants to Mexico
Academy of San Carlos
People from Barcelona